Alexandre Barroso de Oliveira (born 2 February 1963 in Belo Horizonte), known as Alexandre Barroso, is a Brazilian football manager.

Career
Degree in Physical Education from the Federal University of Minas Gerais (UFMG) in 1987, Alexandre Barroso joined the football two years later, assuming the physical preparation of Professional Cruise team, a position he held until 1996. In Fox, was champion of the Cup Brazil, three-time champion of the State Championship and Super Cup champion.

In 1990, experienced a period of experience in Ichirara Midori High School in Japan, returning to its function in mining team in the same year. In 1997, Barroso took the junior team of Cruzeiro, having won eight trophies with the team, two international.

Since 2003 he coached the Mamoré (MG), Democrata (MG), Atlético U20, Villa Nova (MG), Al-Hilal FC, Ipatinga, CRB, Juventude, Cabofriense.

Honours 
 CRB
 Campeonato Alagoano: 2015

References

External links
 Profile at Soccerway.com
 Profile at Soccerpunter.com

1963 births
Living people
Sportspeople from Belo Horizonte
Brazilian football managers
Esporte Clube Mamoré managers
Esporte Clube Democrata managers
Villa Nova Atlético Clube managers
Ipatinga Futebol Clube managers
Al Hilal SFC managers
Clube de Regatas Brasil managers
Esporte Clube Juventude managers
Associação Desportiva Cabofriense managers
Uberlândia Esporte Clube managers
Tupi Football Club managers